Cunter (formerly known as Hunter) is a five-piece hardcore punk supergroup from Brampton, Ontario whose members are from Moneen, Alexisonfire, BWC Studios and The Abandoned Hearts Club. The band motto is "All intensity, all the time," and they are known for short, ferociously intense songs.

History
Kenny Bridges and Erik Hughes are members of Moneen, which is a rock band. Hughes, Bridges told an interviewer, "has a great scream" and they, along with BWC Studios producer Greg Dawson, mused about starting a punk rock band, as a side project. On November 1, 2009, Bridges called Dawson to say that they should go ahead, and found that Dawson had already written nine songs. Bridges wrote the tenth; Hughes wrote the lyrics in one evening. They recruited two friends: Alexisonfire drummer Jordan Hastings and The Abandoned Hearts Club guitarist Billy Curtiss. 

When they couldn't come up with a name, they borrowed the name of Hughes’ son and called the band 'Hunter'. A Polish band with the same name threatened to sue so, as of May 11, 2011, the band's name became Cunter.

The band’s first EPs were released on 7-inch vinyl by Dine Alone Records. They name their releases according to the number of songs they've recorded; their first EPs were 4, and 8. In 2010, they released their first full-length CD, 10 and, in 2011, 20 (sometimes seen with the sub-title 'Some Really Nice Guy Threatened To Sue Us And Made Us Change Our Name'). In 2013, they released 27, this time on New Damage Records.

Cunter played most of its shows in and around Toronto; they've played club dates and took part in the 2011 Warped Tour.

The band has been inactive since 2013. In 2020, Jordan Hastings said that this is because everyone's so busy, but that he would like to make another Cunter album.

Members
 Kenny Bridges – bass, originally from Moneen
 Billy Curtiss – guitar, originally from The Abandoned Hearts Club
 Greg Dawson – guitar, originally from Haitian Knife Fight / BWC Studios
 Jordan Hastings – drums, originally from Alexisonfire
 Erik Hughes – vocals, originally from Moneen

Live members
 George Pettit – vocals, originally from Alexisonfire
 Aaron Wolff – vocals, originally from The End
 Chris "Hippy" Hughes – guitar, originally from Moneen

Discography

References

External links
 Cunter on MySpace
 Cunter's Artist Profile on Dine Alone Records

Canadian hardcore punk groups
Rock music supergroups
Musical groups established in 2009
Dine Alone Records artists
Musical groups from Brampton
2009 establishments in Ontario